Valencia is a residential township in Sungai Buloh, Selangor, Malaysia.

Background
Valencia is one of Gamuda Land’s township developments in Malaysia that was launched in 2002. The township used to be an eponymous golf course; parts of it still exist today. The concept for this development is a boutique golf residential development and features a private, residents-only, 9-hole golf course and clubhouse.

Access
Valencia is located to the north-west of Kuala Lumpur, in Sungai Buloh, near the Sungai Buloh Forest Reserve and Botanical Garden. It is adjacent to the Sungai Buloh Hospital.

Car
Valencia is accessible via the Kepong-Kuala Selangor Highway Federal Route 54 and the New Klang Valley Expressway (Sungai Buloh Exit).

Public transport
 Sungai Buloh MRT/KTM is nearby, serving as an interchange of KTM Komuter and SBK MRT line. Limited KTM ETS services are available.

Type of development 
Valencia is a  gated residential and private golf development of bungalows, semi-dees, garden terraces and hill court houses.

Design concept 
The design concept for Valencia is focused on a luxurious lifestyle amidst the rolling green terrain of a private golf course.  Valencia consists of four separate precincts, each with their own individual cul-de-sac streets.

The four precincts:-
North Golf
South Golf 
Garden
Hill Court

Valencia features a residents-only golf course, along with a clubhouse and a village square with specialty shops and services.

External links 
Gamuda Land
Valencia Official Website

Petaling District
Townships in Selangor